Tomáš Poštulka (born 2 February 1974 in Prague) is a former Czech football goalkeeper. He is one of the most successful Czech goalkeepers – and together with Petr Čech and Jaromír Blažek the most seasoned Czech goalkeeper in European Cups (Champions League and UEFA Cup). Under Jozef Chovanec he was the #1 goalkeeper in the Czech National Team. Besides Czech Republic, he has played in Costa Rica.

Club career
He began his career in 1982 coming to Sparta Prague and playing in all kind junior Czech national teams (U-18, U-21,...). In 1991, he spent one year in Costa Rica playing 2 league games for Carmelita(1st Costa Rican league). After his comeback he spent some time in Dukla Prague and FK Drnovice (both 1st Czech league). In 1995, he moved to Hradec Kralove where he achieved his first bigger success winning the Czech Cup. From these times came his nickname the "penalties wizard" because of his stats – having saved every second penalty.

Sparta Prague
In 1997 Sparta Prague bought back their goalkeeper to win 5 championships in a row and to be the part of the most successful period in Sparta's post-revolution history. Sparta played the UEFA Champions League many times and the UEFA Cup at the time and "Tomas" got his first invitation to the Czech National Team. He played 7 matches of qualification (all wins) for the EURO 2000 tournament and won the Japan Kirin Cup with the prize for best goalkeeper.

FK Teplice
In 2001 the ambitious team FK Teplice offered Sparta a big transfer price and Postulka moved to North Bohemia. There he celebrated the win of the Czech Cup and underdog victories in the UEFA Cup. In 2005, he set up two season records by going up to 600 minutes without conceding a goal (it was a club record and 10th best time in league history) and the second record was the accomplishment of having 15 clean sheets.

AC Sparta Prague
On 16 February 2007, he was transferred back to his mother club, AC Sparta Prague.

References

External links
 
 Sparta Forever 
 iHned 
 

1974 births
Living people
Footballers from Prague
Association football goalkeepers
Czech footballers
Czech Republic under-21 international footballers
Czech Republic international footballers
A.D. Carmelita footballers
AC Sparta Prague players
Dukla Prague footballers
FK Teplice players
FC Hradec Králové players
FC Viktoria Plzeň players
FK Drnovice players
Czech First League players
Expatriate footballers in Costa Rica
FK Čáslav players
Czech National Football League players